Forest Hills Drive: Homecoming is a concert film about American rapper J. Cole covering his 2015 show at the Crown Coliseum in Fayetteville, North Carolina. It aired on January 9, 2016, on HBO and HBO Now, and includes guest appearances from Jay Z, Drake, and Big Sean.

Premise
The film took place during his Forest Hills Drive Tour at his fall 2015. The film serves as the fifth installment of the documentary series J. Cole: Road to Homecoming.

Reception

Critical response
Billboard called J. Cole a "fitting hometown hero" saying "while Cole places himself at the center of the Scott Lazer-directed production, he's not the star, instead choosing to cede the narrative to his hometown of Fayetteville." Revolt praised the director saying "Lazer masterfully weaved Cole's personal story and the 2014 Forest Hills Drive homecoming concert together throughout the film."

Music

On January 28, 2016, Cole released Forest Hills Drive: Live as well as the music video for "Love Yourz", which were recorded in the live concert film.

Personnel 
 Juro Mez Davis – music mixer
 Elad Marish – re-recording mixer
 Joel Raabe – re-recording mixer
 Raymond Rogers – music mixer
 Sam Kim – assistant camera
 Steven C. Pitts – camera operator
 Robert Crosby – colorist
 Alicia Hedley – assistant editor
 Rik Michul – post producer
 Christopher Spindelilus – post production supervisor
 Maria Simone Williams – assistant editor

References

External links 

J. Cole
HBO documentary films
Concert films
2016 television films
2016 films
2010s American films